Serripes is a genus of molluscs in the family Cardiidae.

Species
 Serripes groenlandicus (Mohr, 1786) — Greenland cockle
 Serripes laperousii (Deshayes, 1839)
 Serripes notabilis (G. B. Sowerby III, 1915)

References

Cardiidae
Bivalve genera